William Rolfe may refer to:

William James Rolfe (1827–1910), American educator
William Rolfe (MP) for Heytesbury (UK Parliament constituency)